There Is No Love in Fluorescent Light is the eighth studio album by Canadian band Stars. It is the follow-up album to No One Is Lost, in 2014. It was released on October 13, 2017.

Background 
The band released a statement about the album, saying "Does no one fall in love under fluorescent light? Pretty sure that's not true, as many an office romance could attest. But as a statement in support of love's delusions, we will stand by it. In love, the lights are different, softer; the air has more oxygen in it; and for a second, all you need is a good chorus to believe this might be the one."

Singles 
"Privilege" and "We Called It Love" were released as singles from the album.

Track listing

Charts

References

2017 albums
Last Gang Records albums
Stars (Canadian band) albums